Mahboob Zahedi (2 February 1929 – 8 April 2006) was an Indian politician who represented the Katwa (Lok Sabha constituency) in West Bengal from 1996 till his death in 2006.

A former soldier of Indian National Army, he had fought British forces under the leadership of Shahnawaz Khan. Besides being a leading organiser of the peasantry in West Bengal, he was also associated with the Left cultural movement and the Indian People's Theatre Association (IPTA).

He was Savadhipati, Zilla Parishad, Bardhaman from 1976 to 1991. He was a member of West Bengal legislative assembly in 1991, representing Bhatar constituency. During the period he was minister, Animal Resource Development, Minority Affairs, Haj and Wakf, Government of West Bengal. During his term as MP he was member of several parliamentary committees.

References

1929 births
People from Purba Bardhaman district
2006 deaths
India MPs 2004–2009
Communist Party of India (Marxist) politicians from West Bengal
Indian National Army personnel
21st-century Indian Muslims
India MPs 1996–1997
India MPs 1998–1999
India MPs 1999–2004
West Bengal MLAs 1991–1996
Lok Sabha members from West Bengal
20th-century Bengalis
21st-century Bengalis